This is a list of island countries. An island is a landmass (smaller than a continent) that is surrounded by water. Many island countries are spread over an archipelago, as is the case with Indonesia and the Philippines—these countries consist of thousands of islands. Others consist of a single island, such as Barbados or Nauru, or part of an island, such as Brunei or the Dominican Republic.

The list also includes two states in free association with New Zealand, the Cook Islands and Niue, as well as two states with limited diplomatic recognition which have de facto control over territories entirely on the islands, Northern Cyprus and Taiwan. In total, 50 island countries and 44 island territories have been included in the lists. Australia is not included as it is considered a continent, although it was historically referred to as an island because of its lack of land borders. Greenland is generally considered as the largest island on Earth and listed among the island territories.

Indonesia is the world's largest island country by area (1,904,569 km2), and by total number of islands (17,504 islands). It is also the world's most populous island country, with a population of over 270 million (the fourth most populous country in the world, after China, India, and the United States).

South America is the only inhabited continent without an island country.

Sovereign states

UN member states and states with limited recognition

Associated states

Dependencies and other territories

Former sovereign island nations and primarily island-based countries

Africa

Asia

Europe

North America

Oceania

Former colonies, possessions, protectorates, and other territories
 Annobón (1474-1778)
  Bay Islands, now a department of Honduras
  Cape Breton Island, now part of Nova Scotia, Canada
  Danish West Indies, now the United States Virgin Islands
  Elobey, Annobón and Corisco (1843–1926) unified with the rest of Spanish Guinea
  Fernando Po (1778-1926)
  The Territory of Hawaii, now Hawaii, a state of the United States
  Heligoland (1807–1890)
  Hong Kong Island (1841–1860), now a part of Hong Kong, a special administrative region of China
  United States of the Ionian Islands, protectorate of the United Kingdom.
  Septinsular Republic, protectorate in the Ionian Islands under nominal Russo-Ottoman joint sovereignty.
  Labuan, briefly part of British North Borneo, the Straits Settlements and Sabah, now a federal territory of Malaysia
  Mayotte, now an overseas department and region of France
  Minorca (1713–1802)
  Colony of Newfoundland (1583–1907) 
  New Hebrides, now Vanuatu
  British North Borneo
  Padang
  Prince of Wales Island between 1786 and 1800, at that point joined by Province Wellesley (now Seberang Perai). Now as the state of Penang in the Malaysian federation.
  Prince Edward Island, now a province of Canada
  The Providence Island colony
  Queen Charlotte Islands
  Réunion, now an overseas department and region of France
 , former British overseas territory dissolved in 1983.
 Socotra Archipelago, now a governorate of Yemen
  Tasmania, now a state of Australia, shares a land boundary with Victoria on Boundary Islet
  Vancouver Island, now a part of British Columbia, Canada
  People's Republic of Zanzibar, now a member of the United Republic of Tanzania.

Island countries with man-made fixed links to continents
 to  via the King Fahd Causeway
 to  via the Johor–Singapore Causeway since 1924, with the Tuas Second Link added in 1998
 to  via the Channel Tunnel

See also

 Archipelagic state
 List of archipelagos
 List of Caribbean countries by population
 List of countries that border only one other country
 List of divided islands
 Lists of islands
 List of islands by area
 List of islands by population
 List of islands by population density
 List of Oceanian countries by population
 List of sovereign states and dependent territories in Oceania
 List of sovereign states and dependent territories in the Indian Ocean
 Small Island Developing States
 Thalassocracy

Notes

References

External links
 Island superlatives

Human geography

Lists of countries by geography
Lists of countries by population density
Countries